Table tennis competitions at the 2015 Pan American Games in Winnipeg were held at the Red River College Gym. A total of four events were held.

Events

Medal table

See also
 List of Pan American Games medalists in table tennis

References

 

Events at the 1999 Pan American Games
Pan American Games
1999
Table tennis competitions in Canada